Stagecoach Lincolnshire is a bus company, formerly known as Lincolnshire RoadCar, which runs services throughout Lincolnshire.

Stagecoach in Lincolnshire is the trading name of the Lincolnshire Road Car Company Limited, which is a subsidiary of the Stagecoach Group, and part of its East Midlands division.

History
The Lincolnshire Road Car Company was formed in 1928 after being renamed from the Lincoln-based Silver Queen Motor Omnibus Company, which was first formed in 1922 and initially ran services to Grantham and Louth. Lincolnshire Road Car had acquired a number of independent operators before joining the Tilling Group in 1929, then going on to acquire the Lincolnshire operations of United Automobile Services in 1931. Under the Transport Act 1968 Lincolnshire Road Car, by then a part of the state-owned Transport Holding Company, became part of the National Bus Company. 

The company ran services from throughout the county of Lincolnshire including some services over the county boundaries to such towns as Newark-on-Trent. Many rural services ran from Lincoln St. Marks Bus Station to the outlying villages surrounding the city.  Although these services ran within the city boundary, passengers were not allowed to use them for internal journeys within the city.  Bus services within the city of Lincoln were provided by Lincoln City (Corporation) Transport. Lincolnshire Road Car not only provided long-distance services within the county but also town services within many towns in the county, such as Louth and Sleaford.

When the Transport Act 1985 deregulated bus services, the National Bus Company was broken up and Lincolnshire Road Car was acquired by the Yorkshire Traction Group in 1988. Prior to this, the company began painting their fleet green and yellow and used fleetnames simply reading 'RoadCar'. Upon deregulation passengers were also permitted to use RoadCar services for journeys wholly within the city of Lincoln and RoadCar and city buses started competing on many routes in Lincoln and around the surrounding villages, the city buses leaving the confines of the city for rural routes for the first time. Lincolnshire RoadCar took over Lincoln City Transport in 1993 after the company incurred losses from competing with RoadCar and had a management buyout offer rejected.

In 1988, Lincolnshire RoadCar acquired the business of Newark-on-Trent independent company W. Gash & Sons. Initially, the company was operated as a separate entity from RoadCar, but in 1989, both companies merged after inspections found the Gash fleet to be mechanically deficient, which saw the traffic commissioner strip Gash of its operating license.

RoadCar became a subsidiary of the Stagecoach Group in December 2005, when that company purchased RoadCar's parent company, Traction Group. The company now trades as Stagecoach in Lincolnshire.

From March 2006, Stagecoach purchased new buses for the company, among them four Alexander Dennis Darts and five MAN 18.220/Alexander Dennis ALX300s for the Gainsborough area, in a bid to improve services, gradually phasing out the oldest of RoadCar's buses. The new vehicles temporarily featured RoadCar logos in the front and side windows, and buses from other Stagecoach areas were seen in the area during the transition. The existing fleet then had their RoadCar logos removed.

At the beginning of August 2006, Stagecoach caused considerable controversy with their decision to make major changes to the bus network in Lincoln. Some services were withdrawn without replacement while others benefited from frequency increases. Following a local media campaign, the company agreed to make some changes to return services to those areas which had lost them. At the same time, the company also lost a majority of its service work in Nottinghamshire to Veolia Transport's subsidiary Dunn-Line and local company KJB.

In Autumn 2007 Stagecoach announced the withdrawal of some services in Louth, Lincoln and Gainsborough. The threatened services survived after successful negotiations with the district councils over subsidies.

In August 2008, the company's depot in Louth was closed, with some routes being taken over by Skegness and Grimsby depots and a number of contracted routes surrendered.

The company opened their brand new depot in Skegness in September 2009. It is located on Burgh Road and cost £2.2 million.

Depots
 Gainsborough (Lusher Way, Corringham Road Industrial Estate)
 Lincoln (Great Northern Terrace)
 Newark (Now regarded as outstation of Lincoln)
 Scunthorpe (High Street East)
 Skegness (Skegness Road, Burgh Le Marsh - previously at Grosvenor Road)

Services

InterConnect

Stagecoach in Lincolnshire are the main operator of the 'InterConnect' service, a network of rural and interurban bus services around the county. Bus services operate to urban destinations such as Lincoln, Gainsborough, Skegness and Scunthorpe via the rural communities in between. Buses are painted in a purple livery based on the previous Stagecoach livery. The service is also jointly operated by Brylaine Travel.

Simplibus networks
In Lincoln, Stagecoach first introduced the Simplibus network in February 2017, the third such network to be launched in Stagecoach East Midlands. A £3 million investment into the city's bus services saw ten new single-deck buses enter service on a numerically renumbered route network. This development coincided with the opening of Lincoln's new bus station in January.

In Scunthorpe, Stagecoach entered a partnership with local independent bus company Hornsbys and North Lincolnshire Council as part of a Quality Bus Partnership in October 2018. This saw the creation of 'Simplibus North Lincolnshire', which launched a joint remuneration of Stagecoach and Hornsbys bus services around Scunthorpe and Brigg and surrounding areas into numerical order, a circular route created in Scunthorpe, and buses branded with Simplibus logos across both fleets.

The launch of the new Stagecoach Group liveries in 2020 has seen the Simplibus branding in both towns being slowly phased out.

Humber FastCat

The Humber FastCat is a half-hourly cross-river bus service over the River Humber that connects Scunthorpe and Kingston upon Hull via the Humber Bridge. Numbered the 350, the service was first operated by Lincolnshire RoadCar as a National Bus Company subsidiary in 1981 following the opening of the Humber Bridge.

The 350 was relaunched as the 'Humber FastCat' by Stagecoach in Lincolnshire in 2009, receiving an investment of six branded single deckers, each of which carried a name on a special orange livery. The service was also launched as a joint operation with East Yorkshire, who operate a single bus independent of the Stagecoach fleet. The FastCat livery would later be refreshed in 2014, in conjunction with the introduction of the sister 'Humber Flyer' service at Stagecoach Grimsby-Cleethorpes. Stagecoach later invested in a £1 million fleet of six new Alexander Dennis Enviro200 MMCs for the service in 2017, featuring USB charging and leather seating.

Seasider open top buses
Stagecoach operates a number of open top buses on the Skegness seafront. Originally branded as the 'Coastal Cruiser', this service was  relaunched in April 2014 as the 'Skegness Seasider'. Six buses were refurbished in colourful liveries and given names for the service, while three more buses named Teddy, Sunny and Sweetie were added to the fleet in 2018. Two open top buses also operate on the Cleethorpes seafront.

Accidents and Incidents

On 11 April 2004, a Volvo B7TL double-decker bus with East Lancs Vyking bodywork operated by Lincolnshire RoadCar collided with a number of pedestrians outside the main entrance to Fantasy Island amusement park on Sea Lane in Ingoldmells. Five pedestrians were killed and six more injured, two critically, in the accident. Following the accident, RoadCar were found guilty of breaching safety provisions for allowing the driver to operate the vehicle type without proper training and for operating a vehicle with faulty brakes; as a result, they were fined £2,000 at Skegness Magistrates Court on 8 August 2005. The bus driver was found guilty of five counts of causing death by dangerous driving and a single count of driving without due care and attention, and was sentenced to five years' imprisonment on 9 November 2005.

References

External links
Lincolnshire section of Stagecoach website
Lincs InterConnect website

Stagecoach Group bus operators in England
Bus operators in Lincolnshire
Companies based in Lincoln, England